Kart Racer is a 2003 Canadian-German sports drama film directed by Stuart Gillard, and starring Will Rothhaar, David Gallagher and Randy Quaid. In the United States, it premiered on television on ABC Family in 2005.

The film centers on a boy named Watts "Lightbulb" Davies (Will Rothhaar) who likes to race go-karts. Unable to come up with enough funds to purchase his own kart, Watts convinces his father, Vic Davies (Randy Quaid) (a former kart racer himself), to help him build a cart and teach him how to drive. As he follows his dream, he then has to race against karting champion Scott McKenna and local bully Rodney Wells.

Footage of the racing simulator NASCAR Racing 2002 Season by Papyrus Design Group can be seen as they are playing it at the arcade.

Plot
Watts Davies (Will Rothhaar) is a 14-year-old kid who decides to take up go-kart racing, he finds a new pursuit and begins to reconnect with his father, Vic (Randy Quaid), whom he has been clashing with since the death of his mother. Watts has an intense rivalry with Rodney Wells (Joe Dinicol), his enemy and local bully. Rodney stops at nothing to make Watts look bad; and he and his crew are not above getting Watts arrested. A little later, after more trouble, Watts sadly watches as Rodney and his dad buys the kart that he had originally set his eyes upon.

In an effort to bond with Watts, Vic (who is a former racer himself) helps him build a kart together and begins to train him in the fine art of kart racing, in which Watts proves to be a natural. With Vic's help and training, and a newly built kart, Watts enters the race. Throughout the film as Vic teaches Watts how to compete, the young driver begins to fall for Dahlia (Amanda De Martinis), an attractive and rebellious local girl and a graffiti artist. The final race ends up being between Watts, Rodney and driver Scott McKenna. Rodney tries to take out Watts but ends up crashing with 2 laps to go. The final lap is between Watts and Scott, and in a photo finish, Watts edges Scott to take the checkered flag.

Cast
 Randy Quaid – Vic Davies
 Will Rothhaar – Watts Davies
 Jennifer Wigmore – Deputy Jenna West
 David Gallagher – Scott McKenna
 Amanda de Martinis – Dahlia Stone
 Joe Dinicol – Rodney Wells
 Jordan Conti – Bink
 Johnny Griffin – Toomey
 Steve Adams – Clint Meyers
 Philip Spensley – Father Patrick Ramsey
 Leif Bristow – Rodney's Dad
 Harland Williams – Zee

Accolades 
The film won a Crystal Heart Award at the Heartland Film Festival and was nominated for a DGC Craft Award by the Directors Guild of Canada.

References

External links 
 
 
 

2003 films
Canadian auto racing films
English-language Canadian films
German auto racing films
English-language German films
ABC Family original films
2003 comedy-drama films
Kart racing
Films about dysfunctional families
Films directed by Stuart Gillard
Films scored by Jeff Danna
Canadian comedy-drama films
2000s English-language films
German comedy-drama films
2000s Canadian films
2000s German films